Taking Up Your Precious Time is the debut studio album by the then electronic music duo Pretty Lights (Derek Vincent Smith and Michal Menert). The album was released October 23, 2006 by Pretty Lights Music. It was the only album released with Menert as part of the project, who left shortly after the album's release. It is known for including the song "Finally Moving" (which samples the song "Something's Got a Hold on Me", a 1962 single from "Etta James Top Ten"). The song is popular amongst fans and is a favorite at live performances.

Track listing

References

Albums free for download by copyright owner
Pretty Lights albums
2006 debut albums